Nerd Corps Entertainment was a Canadian animation studio located in Vancouver, British Columbia. Founded by former Mainframe Entertainment producers Asaph Fipke and Chuck Johnson in 2002, it specialized in CGI animation, computer animation, and Flash animation.

Aside just animation, Nerd Corps developed and produced in-house television works and produced promotional materials and creative services for merchandising and licensing partners.

It was acquired by DHX Media on December 24, 2014, who then merged it with another acquired animation studio, Studio B Productions, to form its in-house flagship division, DHX Studios in 2016.

The studio notably produces the Monster High animated films for Mattel and animated series including Slugterra, Blaze and the Monster Machines, Kate & Mim-Mim, Storm Hawks, League of Super Evil, Hot Wheels Battle Force 5, and Max Steel.

History
On December 24, 2014, Canadian company DHX Media acquired Nerd Corps.

In 2016, the former Nerd Corps team was relocated to a new facility in Vancouver, which also houses the former Studio B Productions, an animation studio which DHX Media acquired in 2007.

Productions
Dragon Booster (2004–2006) (co-produced by ApolloScreen Filmproduktion, the Story Hat and Alliance Atlantis)
Storm Hawks (2007–2009)
League of Super Evil (2009–2012)
Hot Wheels Battle Force 5 (2009–2011) (co-produced with Mattel and Nelvana)
Rated A for Awesome (2011–2012)
Slugterra (2012–2016) 
Monster High (2012–2016) (co-produced with Mattel)
Max Steel (2013–2014) (co-produced with FremantleMedia Kids & Family and Mattel Playground Productions)
Kate & Mim-Mim (2014–2018) (co-produced with FremantleMedia Kids & Family, continued on as DHX Studios Vancouver)
Slugterra: Ghoul from Beyond (2014) (co-produced with Disney XD Canada)
Slugterra: Return of the Elementals (2014) (co-produced with DHX Media) 
Blaze and the Monster Machines (season 1) (2014–present, continued on as DHX Studios Vancouver)
Endangered Species (2015–2016)
Untitled Power Rangers animated adaptation (cancelled) (co-produced by Saban Brands, Toei Company and the Walt Disney Company)

Animation only
The Deep (2015–present) (co-produced with DHX Media and Technicolor SA, continued on as DHX Studios Vancouver)

References

WildBrain
Canadian animation studios
Mass media companies established in 2002
Mass media companies disestablished in 2016
2014 mergers and acquisitions
2002 establishments in British Columbia
2016 disestablishments in British Columbia